The Danish Zionist Federation (Danish: Dansk Zionistforbund) is the leading Zionist organization in Denmark. The federation is affiliated with the World Zionist Organization.

History
Arne Melchior headed the federation between 1975 and 1979.

In 2012, the Danish Zionist Federation displayed Israeli flags at a diversity festival in Copenhagen, despite being asked by organizers to not fly the flag for "security reasons". Several verbal confrontations occurred at the federation's stand, but did not escalate into violence. Event organizer Pernille Kjeldgaard stated that there was no flag policy and that the group was only asked as a "safety precaution". Max Meyer, head of the federation, stated that "It is a shame that one group is discriminated against, especially at a diversity celebration."

See also
History of the Jews in Denmark

References

External links
Copenhagen: Danish Zionist Federation, National Library of Israel
Danish Zionist Federation official website
Doing Zionism in Denmark, World Zionist Organization Department for Zionist Activities
Looking at Zionism, Yinonro.com

Zionism in Denmark
Zionist organizations